Vasylkivka Raion  was a raion (district) of Dnipropetrovsk Oblast, southeastern-central Ukraine. Its administrative centre was located at the urban-type settlement of Vasylkivka. The raion was abolished on 18 July 2020 as part of the administrative reform of Ukraine, which reduced the number of raions of Dnipropetrovsk Oblast to seven. The area of Vasylkivka Raion was merged into Synelnykove Raion.

In the 26 October 2014 Ukrainian parliamentary election Dmytro Yarosh as a Right Sector candidate won a parliament seat (the only one for Right Sector) by winning single-member districts number 39 ("Vasylkivka") located in Vasylkivka Raion and neighbouring raions with 29.76% of the votes. 

At the time of disestablishment, the raion consisted of two hromadas:
 Mykolaivka rural hromada with the administration in the selo of Mykolaivka;
 Vasylkivka settlement hromada with the administration in Vasylkivka.

In August 2020, Mykolaivka rural hromada was renamed Dubovyky rural hromada, and its administration was moved to the selo of Dubovyky.

References

Former raions of Dnipropetrovsk Oblast
1923 establishments in Ukraine
Ukrainian raions abolished during the 2020 administrative reform